Hydrogen battery may refer to:
 Nickel–hydrogen battery, a rechargeable battery with a power source based on nickel and hydrogen
 Hydrogen fuel cell, an electrochemical cell that uses hydrogen as a fuel source